Hiroji (written: 博二, 博治 or 弘次) is a masculine Japanese given name. Notable people with the name include:

, Japanese footballer
, Japanese academic and translator
, Japanese video game designer
, Japanese photographer
, Japanese table tennis player

Japanese masculine given names